Todd Michael Rizzo (born May 24, 1971) is an American former professional baseball pitcher. He played during two seasons at the Major League Baseball (MLB) for the Chicago White Sox. He was signed by the Los Angeles Dodgers as an amateur free agent .

References
"Todd Rizzo Statistics". The Baseball Cube. 25 January 2008.

External links

1971 births
Living people
American expatriate baseball players in Canada
American expatriate baseball players in Taiwan
Baseball players from Pennsylvania
Birmingham Barons players
Bowie Baysox players
Calgary Cannons players
Camden Riversharks players
Charlotte Knights players
Chicago White Sox players
Fresno Grizzlies players
Gulf Coast Dodgers players
Las Vegas 51s players
Major League Baseball pitchers
Nashville Sounds players
Ottawa Lynx players
People from Clifton Heights, Pennsylvania
Prince William Cannons players
Salt Lake Buzz players
San Antonio Tejanos players
Tyler Wildcatters players
Uni-President Lions players
Yakima Bears players